Vineyard station may refer to:

Vineyard railway station in Sydney, Australia
Vineyard station (FrontRunner) in Utah, United States